The Michelson–Morley Award is a science award that originated from the Michelson Award that was established in 1963 by the Case Institute of Technology. It was renamed in 1968 by the newly formed Case Western Reserve University (CWRU) after the federation between the Case Institute of Technology and Western Reserve University. The award continued until 1992, and was re-established in 2002. The award in its various forms is named for physics professor Albert A. Michelson (Case School of Applied Sciences) and chemistry professor Edward W. Morley (Western Reserve University) who carried out the famous Michelson–Morley experiment of 1887.

Recipients
Michelson Award
1963 – John Hasbrouck Van Vleck
1964 – Haldan Keffer Hartline
1965 – Luis W. Alvarez
1966 – Edwin H. Land
1967 – Martin Schwarzschild

Michelson–Morley Award
1968 – John Bardeen
1970 – Charles H. Townes
1976 – John D. Roberts
1977 – Gene M. Amdahl
1978 – Harry George Drickamer
1979 – Hans Liepmann
1980 – Frank Albert Cotton
1981 – Francis Crick
1982 – Michael Ellis Fisher
1983 – Subrahmanyan Chandrasekhar
1984 – Paul Lauterbur
1985 – Paul Fleury
1986 – Richard Zare
1987 – Robert H. Dicke and George A. Olah
1988 – John J. Hopfield
1989 – Herman F. Mark
1990 – Frederick Reines
1991 – John Cahn
1992 – Watt W. Webb
2002 – Frank Wilczek
2003 – Stephen Hawking
2020 – Jack Kincaid

The 1987 award was jointly to a physicist and chemist to honour the centenary of the Michelson–Morley experiment.

References

Sources
Michelson–Morley Award Lecture (Case Western Reserve University)
The Michelson Lectures and Awards, p. 339 of Physics at a Research University, Case Western Reserve 1830-1990 (2005) by William Fickinger, Professor Emeritus (Appendix D: Programs and Lecture Series)
Happenings, The Scientist (1 June 1987)

American science and technology awards